Little Missouri National Grassland is a National Grassland located in western North Dakota, USA. At , it is the largest grassland in the country. Enclaved within its borders is Theodore Roosevelt National Park, which is managed by the National Park Service (and therefore not included in the preceding statistics). The Little Missouri National Grassland was once a part of the Custer National Forest, but is now a part of the Dakota Prairie Grasslands, a National Forest unit consisting entirely of National Grasslands.  A predominant feature of the grassland is colorful and beautiful badlands, a rugged terrain extensively eroded by wind and water. It is a mixed grass prairie, meaning it has both long and short grass.

The boundaries of the grasslands on certain maps can be misleading.  Within the boundaries of the national grassland are significant portions of state-owned and privately owned land, much of it leased by cattle ranchers for grazing. Overall, in descending order of land area, it is located in parts of McKenzie, Billings, Slope, and Golden Valley counties.

Private land intersperses the public grassland acres and there is heavy cattle grazing throughout with 253 allotments in the Medora district and more than 190 allotments in the Mckenzie district.

The Little Missouri River meanders through the grassland and White Butte, North Dakota's highest point, is located in the extreme southeast corner, south of the town of Amidon.

The grassland is administered by the Forest Service as part of the Dakota Prairie Grasslands from offices in Bismarck, North Dakota. There are local ranger district offices in Dickinson and Watford City.

The ongoing oil and gas exploration, extraction, and distribution in the region has the potential for long term negative impacts on the soil, water, vegetation, and wildlife of the grassland, including threatened and endangered species.

See also
 Initial Rock
 Yule Ranch

References

External links

 Dakota Prairie Grasslands - U.S. Forest Service

National Grasslands of the United States
Protected areas established in 1960
Protected areas of McKenzie County, North Dakota
Protected areas of Billings County, North Dakota
Protected areas of Slope County, North Dakota
Protected areas of Golden Valley County, North Dakota
Grasslands of North Dakota
National Grassland